The Pritzker School of Medicine is the M.D.-granting unit of the Biological Sciences Division of the University of Chicago. It is located on the university's main campus in the historic Hyde Park neighborhood of Chicago and matriculated its first class in 1927. The medical school offers a full-time Doctor of Medicine degree program, joint degree programs, graduate medical education, and continuing medical education.

Rankings
U.S. News & World Report, in its 2022 edition of rankings, ranked Pritzker School of Medicine #34 in "Best Medical Schools: Primary Care" and #17 in "Best Medical Schools: Research".

History 
Interest in opening a medical school at the University of Chicago began in 1898 when the university became affiliated with Rush Medical College while Chicago endeavored to establish funds for the construction of a medical school. The affiliation with Rush Medical College continued until 1942. In 1916, the university's Board of Trustees set aside $5.3 million for its development, but World War I delayed its construction until 1921. With construction complete in 1927, the school matriculated its first class of medical students. Following a $16 million gift from the Pritzker family of Chicago (founders of the Hyatt hotel group) to the University of Chicago, the School of Medicine was renamed in their honor in 1968.

Pritzker was the first medical school to hold the now international tradition of the white coat ceremony in 1989, which celebrates the students' transition and commitment to a lifelong career as a physician.

Admissions 
For the entering Class of 2016–2017, 5,640 people applied and 719 interviewed for 88 spots in the class. Accepted applicants had a median GPA of 3.88 and median MCAT score of 520.

Education 
The Pritzker School of Medicine offers the Doctor of Medicine (M.D.) degree. The school offers joint doctorate degrees through its Medical Scientist Training Program, Growth, Development, and Disabilities Training Program and MD-PhD Programs in Medicine, the Social Sciences, and Humanities. Joint master's degrees are offered in business, law, and policy.

The school's primary teaching hospital is the University of Chicago Medical Center. In July 2008, Pritzker entered into a teaching affiliation with NorthShore University HealthSystem.

Notable alumni 
 Clark L. Anderson, class of 1964, immunologist and Professor Emeritus,  Ohio State University College of Medicine
 Bruce Beutler, class of 1981, American immunologist and geneticist. Together with Jules A. Hoffmann, he received one-half of the 2011 Nobel Prize in Physiology or Medicine, for "their discoveries concerning the activation of innate immunity".
Ernest Beutler, class of 1950, German-born American hematologist and biomedical scientist. He made important discoveries about the causes of a number of diseases, including anemias, Gaucher disease, disorders of iron metabolism and Tay–Sachs disease.
Richard Kekuni Blaisdell, class of 1948, professor emeritus of medicine at the University of Hawaiʻi in Honolulu, and a longtime organizer in the Hawaiian Sovereignty Movement.
 David Bodian, class of 1937, American medical scientist whose work helped lay the groundwork for the eventual development of polio vaccines by combining neurological research with the study of the pathogenesis of polio.
 Robert M. Chanock, class of 1947, American pediatrician and virologist who made major contributions to the prevention and treatment of childhood respiratory infections.
Anne Searls De Groot, class of 1983, co-founder and CEO/CSO of the immunoinformatics company EpiVax.
Robert Gallo, GME 1965, known for his role in the discovery of the human immunodeficiency virus (HIV) as the infectious agent responsible for acquired immune deficiency syndrome (AIDS) and in the development of the HIV blood test.
Todd Golub, class of 1989, Professor of Pediatrics at the Harvard Medical School, the Charles A. Dana Investigator in Human Cancer Genetics at the Dana-Farber Cancer Institute, and a founding member of the Broad Institute of MIT and Harvard.
Clarence Lushbaugh, Ph.D. class of 1942, M.D. class of 1948, pathologist and radiobiological specialist
Sara Branham Matthews, PhD class of 1923, MD class of 1934, was an American microbiologist and physician best known for her research into the isolation and treatment of Neisseria meningitidis, a causative organism of meningitis.
Anne L. Peters, class of 1983, endocrinologist, diabetes expert, and professor of clinical medicine at the Keck School of Medicine of USC
 Joseph Ransohoff, class of 1941, pioneer in the field of neurosurgery; founder of the first neurosurgical intensive care unit; chief of neurosurgery at N.Y.U. Medical Center
Gerald Reaven, class of 1953, noted researcher of diabetes and insulin resistance.
 Janet Rowley, class of 1948, American human geneticist and the first scientist to identify a chromosomal translocation as the cause of leukemia and other cancers.
 Arthur K. Shapiro, class of 1955, psychiatrist and expert on Tourette syndrome.
Donald F. Steiner, class of 1956, an American biochemist and discoverer of proinsulin.

References

External links 
 Pritzker School of Medicine
Guide to the University of Chicago Department of Medicine Records 1940-1942 at the University of Chicago Special Collections Research Center

Schools of the University of Chicago

Medical schools in Illinois
Educational institutions established in 1927
1927 establishments in Illinois